The following is the qualification system and qualified countries for the Water skiing at the 2019 Pan American Games competitions.

Qualification system
A total of 48 athletes will qualify to compete at the games. The top seven nations (including the host nation, Peru) at the 2018 Pan American Water Skiing Championship, will each receive four athlete quotas. The remaining spots (four) will be distributed as two per nation (one per gender) to the next best ranked countries. A further 8 spots are made available for wakeboard qualifiers in each event. A nation may enter a maximum of six athletes, with the host nation Peru receiving automatic qualification for all six spots.

Qualification timeline

Qualification summary

Water skiing

Wakeboarding
A total of nine countries qualified in wakeboarding.

References

Qualification for the 2019 Pan American Games
Water skiing at the 2019 Pan American Games